Sergey Vasilevich Kuzmin (born 24 June 1987) is a Russian professional boxer who held the WBA Intercontinental heavyweight title from 2018 to 2019.
As an amateur he won a gold medal at the 2010 European Championships.

At the 2011 World Amateur Boxing Championships he lost to unsung Mohamed Arjaoui

Professional career

Kuzmin vs. Dawejko 
On 9 March 2019, Kuzmin faced Joey Dawejko. Kuzmin won the fight via majority decision, 96–94, 96-94 and 95–95 on the scorecards.

Kuzmin vs. Hunter 
In his next bout, Kuzmin faced Michael Hunter. Hunter was ranked #9 by the WBA, #10 by the IBF, #12 by the WBO and #14 by the WBC. Hunter won the fight convincingly on the scorecards, 117–110, 117-110 and 117–110.

Kuzmin vs. Bakole 
In his next bout, Kuzmin fought Martin Bakole. Bakole managed to secure the victory via unanimous decision victory, 98–92, 97-93 and 96–94 on the scorecards.

Professional boxing record

{|class="wikitable" style="text-align:center"
|-
!
!Result
!Record
!Opponent
!Type
!Round, time
!Date
!Location
!Notes
|-
|21
|Win
|18–2 
|style="text-align:left;"|Tian Fick
|UD
|10
|24 Sep 2022
|style="text-align:left;"|
|
|-
|20
|Win
|17–2 
|style="text-align:left;"|Richard Lartey
|KO
|1 (10), 
|27 May 2022
|style="text-align:left;"|
|
|-
|19
|Win
|16–2 
|style="text-align:left;"|Igor Macedo
|TKO
|10 (10), 
|26 Nov 2021
|style="text-align:left;"|
|
|-
|18
|Loss
|15–2 
|align=left|Martin Bakole
|UD
|10
|12 Dec 2020
|style="text-align:left;"|
|style="text-align:left;"|
|-
|17
|Loss
|15–1 
|style="text-align:left;"|Michael Hunter
|UD
|12
|13 Sep 2019
|style="text-align:left;"|
|style="text-align:left;"| 
|-
|16
|Win
|15–0 
|style="text-align:left;"|Joey Dawejko
|
|10
|9 Mar 2019
|style="text-align:left;"|
|style="text-align:left;"|  
|-
|15
|Win
|14–0 
|style="text-align:left;"|LaRon Mitchell
|TKO
|6 (12), 
|24 Nov 2018
|style="text-align:left;"|
|style="text-align:left;"|  
|-
|14
|Win
|13–0 
|style="text-align:left;"|David Price
|RTD
|4 (10), 
|22 Sep 2018
|style="text-align:left;"|
|style="text-align:left;"|
|-
|13
|Win
|12–0 
|style="text-align:left;"|Jeremiah Karpency
|KO
|6 (8), 
|21 Apr 2018
|style="text-align:left;"|
| 
|-
|12
|style="background:#DDD"|NC
|11–0 
|style="text-align:left;"|Amir Mansour
|
|3 (12), 
|27 Nov 2017
|style="text-align:left;"|
|style="text-align:left;"|
|-
|11
|Win
|11–0
|style="text-align:left;"|Malcolm Tann
|KO
|4 (8), 
|23 Jun 2017
|style="text-align:left;"|
|
|-
|10
|Win
|10–0
|style="text-align:left;"|Keenan Hickman
|RTD
|3 (8), 
|14 Apr 2017
|style="text-align:left;"|
|
|-
|9
|Win
|9–0
|style="text-align:left;"|Vaclav Pejsar
|TKO
|2 (10), 
|23 Feb 2017
|style="text-align:left;"|
|style="text-align:left;"|
|-
|8
|Win
|8–0
|style="text-align:left;"|Mike Sheppard
|TKO
|1 (10), 
|29 Oct 2016
|style="text-align:left;"|
| 
|-
|7
|Win
|7–0
|style="text-align:left;"|Konstantin Airich
|TKO
|2 (10), 
|8 Apr 2016
|style="text-align:left;"|
|style="text-align:left;"|
|-
|6
|Win
|6–0
|style="text-align:left;"|Rodney Hernandez
|UD
|10
|18 Feb 2016
|style="text-align:left;"|
|
|-
|5
|Win
|5–0
|style="text-align:left;"|Irineu Beato Costa Junior
|KO
|3 (10), 
|13 Nov 2015
|style="text-align:left;"|
|
|-
|4
|Win
|4–0
|style="text-align:left;"|Darnell Wilson
|TKO
|4 (8), 
|27 Aug 2015
|style="text-align:left;"|
|
|-
|3
|Win
|3–0
|style="text-align:left;"|Marcelo Luiz Nascimento
|UD
|8
|22 Jun 2015
|style="text-align:left;"|
|
|-
|2
|Win
|2–0
|style="text-align:left;"|Emilio Ezequiel Zarate
|UD
|6
|1 Mar 2015
|style="text-align:left;"|
|
|-
|1
|Win
|1–0
|style="text-align:left;"|Nicholas Buule
|KO
|1 (6), 
|28 Nov 2014
|style="text-align:left;"|
|

References

External links

Sergey Kuzmin - Profile, News Archive & Current Rankings at Box.Live

|-

1987 births
Living people
Heavyweight boxers
Russian male boxers
21st-century Russian people